Mount Tatum is a  mountain in the Alaska Range, in Denali National Park and Preserve. Mount Tatum lies to the northeast of Denali on Carpe Ridge with Muldrow Glacier to the west and Traleika Glacier to the east. Mount Tatum was named about 1945 by Bradford Washburn for Robert G. Tatum, a participant in the first ascent of Mount McKinley, reaching the South Peak on June 1, 1913.

See also
Mountain peaks of Alaska

References

Alaska Range
Mountains of Denali Borough, Alaska
Denali National Park and Preserve
Mountains of Alaska